Spur Awards are literary prizes awarded annually by the Western Writers of America (WWA). The purpose of the Spur Awards is to honor writers for distinguished writing about the American West. The Spur awards began in 1953, the same year the WWA was founded. An author need not be a member of the WWA to receive a Spur Award. Among previous Spur Award winners are Larry McMurtry for Lonesome Dove, Michael Blake for Dances with Wolves, Glendon Swarthout for The Shootist, and Tony Hillerman for Skinwalkers.

The Owen Wister Award for lifetime achievement in Western literature, first awarded in 1961, is also a Western Writers of America award, distinct from the Spur awards.

Spur awards were first awarded in five categories: western novel, historical novel, juvenile, short story, and reviewer. The categories have expanded and changed (or been renamed) over the years. There is no guarantee an award will be made in each category every year.
The 2015 Spur Awards have the following categories:

 Spur Award for Best Western Novel
 Spur Award for Best Novel of the West
 Spur Award for Best Western Contemporary Novel
 Spur Award for Best Western Historical Novel
 Spur Award for Best Western Traditional Novel
 Spur Award for Best Western Juvenile Fiction
 Spur Award for Best First Novel
 Spur Award for Best Western Historical Nonfiction
 Spur Award for Best Western Contemporary Nonfiction
 Spur Award for Best Western Biography
 Spur Award for Best Western Juvenile Nonfiction
 Spur Award for Best First Nonfiction Book
 Spur Award for Best Western Storyteller (Illustrated Children's Book)
 Spur Award for Best Western Short Fiction
 Spur Award for Best Western Short Nonfiction
 Spur Award for Best Western Poem
 Spur Award for Best Western Song
 Spur Award for Best Western Drama Script
 Spur Award for Best Western Documentary Script

References

External links
 Western Writers of America
 Western Writers of America – Spur Award
 Western Writers of America – Spur Award winners
 Goodreads SPUR Award Winners
 Barnes & Noble: Spur Awards by Year
 Exxon Valdez Book Wins Western Writers Award
 The Homesman screenplay Wins WWA Spur Award

American literary awards
Culture of the Western United States
Western (genre) novels